Loka is a village west of Šentjernej in southeastern Slovenia. The area is part of the traditional region of Lower Carniola. It is now included in the Southeast Slovenia Statistical Region.

Remains of a Roman villa rustica have been found close to the settlement.

References

External links
Loka on Geopedia

Populated places in the Municipality of Šentjernej